In the United States, Pullman was used to refer to railroad sleeping cars that were built and operated on most U.S. railroads by the Pullman Company (founded by George Pullman) from 1867 to December 31, 1968.

Other uses
Pullman also refers to railway dining cars in Europe that were operated by the Pullman Company, or lounge cars operated by the Compagnie Internationale des Wagons-Lits. Specifically, in Great Britain, Pullman refers to the lounge cars operated by the British Pullman Car Company.

The nickname Pullman coach was used in some European cities for the first long (four-axle) electric tramcars whose appearance resembled the Pullman railway cars and that were usually more comfortable than their predecessors. Such coaches ran in Kyiv from 1907 and in Odessa from 1912.
In the 1920s, tramcars nicknamed Pullmanwagen in German ran in Leipzig, Cologne, Frankfurt and Zürich.

In some Western European countries in the 1930s, 1940s, and 1950s, some especially luxurious motor coaches were sometimes referred to as Auto-Pullmans.

In 1963, the luxurious Mercedes-Benz 600 was introduced, with a range including a long wheelbase version called Pullman. Later, stretched versions of regular Mercedes-Benz S-Class cars were also called Pullman.

In Greek and Italian, the word "pullman" is used to refer to a coach bus. In Greek, it would be spelled "πούλμαν".

In Latin America, pullman may refer to a luxury bus as well as to a railroad sleeping car.

Gallery

See also
 Pullman loaf, a type of long, square bread developed to be baked in the small kitchens of rail cars
 Starlight Express, a train musical in which two characters are modeled on a Pullman.
 , Railway Coach roof design following the Pullman American influence.

Notes

References

External links
 The Pullman Project
 Canadian National Railways Sleeping Car No. 1683 St. Hyacinthe—photographs and short history of a Sleeping Car built in 1929.
 Chicago Historical Society's Pullman website
 
Pullman Prototypes—Pantagraph (Bloomington, IL newspaper)

Passenger railroad cars
Buses by type
Luxury trains
Luxury brands
Luxury vehicles